John Pettigrew "Ian" MacFarlane (born 5 December 1968) is a Scottish former footballer, who played for Hamilton Academical, Dumbarton and Clydebank.

References

1968 births
Scottish footballers
Dumbarton F.C. players
Hamilton Academical F.C. players
Clydebank F.C. (1965) players
Scottish Football League players
Living people
Association football goalkeepers
Footballers from Bellshill
Bellshill Athletic F.C. players
Scottish Junior Football Association players